David Ross (born February 1, 1938) is a former American football player who played with the New York Titans. He played college football at Los Angeles State College.

References

1938 births
Living people
American football ends
Cal State Los Angeles Diablos football players
New York Titans (AFL) players
Players of American football from California
Sportspeople from San Diego County, California